The 1998–99 Heineken Cup was the fourth edition of the Heineken Cup. Competing teams from France, Ireland, Italy, Wales, and Scotland, were divided into four pools of four, in which teams played home and away matches against each other. Cardiff and Swansea did not compete due to a dispute with their union, the Welsh Rugby Union, whereas teams from England did not compete due to a dispute between European Rugby and the Rugby Football Union. The pool winners and runners-up qualified for the knock-out stages.

Teams

Pool stage

In the pool matches teams received 2 points for a win, 1 point for a draw and 0 points for a defeat.

Pool 1

Pool 2

Pool 3

Pool 4

Seeding

Knockout stage

Quarter-finals

Semi-finals

Final

References

 
1996–97
1998–99 in European rugby union
1998–99 in French rugby union
1998–99 in Irish rugby union
1998–99 in Italian rugby union
1998–99 in Scottish rugby union
1998–99 in Welsh rugby union